Sanctified may refer to:

Sanctification, the process of making holy

Music

Albums
Sanctified (album), by Morgana Lefay, 1995
Sanctified, by Jack McDuff, 1961
Sanctified, by the Rance Allen Group, 1975

Songs
"Sanctified", by The Communards, released as an additional track on the 2012 reissue of their eponymous 1986 debut album
"Sanctified", by Nine Inch Nails from Pretty Hate Machine, 1989
"Sanctified" (song), by Rick Ross featuring Big Sean and Kanye West, 2014